The 2003 Kent State Golden Flashes football team represented the Kent State University during the 2003 NCAA Division I-A football season. Kent State competed as a member of the Mid-American Conference (MAC), and played their home games at Dix Stadium. The Golden Flashes were led by fifth-year head coach Dean Pees, who resigned following the conclusion of the season.

Schedule

References

Kent State
Kent State Golden Flashes football seasons
Kent State Golden Flashes football